FFL Partners, LLC, previously known as Friedman Fleischer & Lowe, is an American private equity firm, founded in 1997 by Tully Friedman, Spencer Fleischer, David Lowe, and Christopher Masto.  The firm makes investments primarily through leveraged buyouts and growth capital investments and is focused on investing in the U.S. middle-market.

FFL has focused its efforts on several core target industries including healthcare services, financial services, business services, and consumer products. FFL is based in San Francisco and employs over 20 investment professionals. Since inception, FFL has raised approximately $4.6 billion of investor commitments.

History

FFL was founded in 1997 by Tully Friedman, together with Spencer Fleischer, David Lowe, and Christopher Masto.  Prior to founding FFL, in 1984, Tully Friedman had co-founded Hellman & Friedman, one of the largest private equity firms globally, with Warren Hellman.  In contrast to Hellman &Friedman, FFL focuses on smaller, middle market deals.

Spencer Fleischer, was a former member of Morgan Stanley's Investment Banking Operating Committee and the Head of Investment Banking in Asia, Head of Corporate Finance for Europe, Head of UK Corporate Finance, Head of Investment Banking in Los Angeles, and Head of Corporate Finance in San Francisco. David Lowe was Chairman and CEO of medical equipment maker ADAC Laboratories.  Christopher Masto was a Bain & Company consultant and previously an investment banker at Morgan Stanley.

Investment holdings
FFL invests through a series of private equity funds (structured as limited partnerships), and its investors include a variety of pension funds, endowments, and other institutional investors.

The firm's first private equity fund, Friedman Fleischer & Lowe Capital Partners closed in September 1999 with $333 million of investor commitments.  Almost five years later, the firm completed raising $811 million of investor commitments for its second fund, Friedman Fleischer & Lowe Capital Partners II in June 2004. In 2007, the firm raised its third investment fund, Friedman Fleischer & Lowe Capital Partners III, with $1.5 billion of investor commitments.

The following are among the firm's most notable current and previous portfolio companies:

CapitalSource
CHI Overhead Doors
Church's Chicken
Discovery Foods
Geovera
Guardian Home Care
Korn/Ferry
Midwest Dental
Milestone AV Technologies
Tempur-Pedic
TriTech Software Systems
WellStreet
Wilton Re

Rankings
HEC-Dow Jones's Private Equity Performance Ranking lists the world's top private equity firms in terms of aggregate performance and listed FFL for three years:

Ranked #1 in 2012
Ranked #2 in 2011
Ranked #11 in 2010

People

FFL's team consists of experienced professionals with diverse backgrounds in operational and strategic management, investment banking, private equity investing, and consulting. The firm’s principals have invested over $2.5 billion in over 50 companies and have over 100 years of collective experience as investors, senior operating executives, and advisors.

Investment Principals
Tully M. Friedman: Hellman & Friedman (Co-Founder); Salomon Brothers (Managing Director)
Spencer Fleischer: Morgan Stanley (Member of Investment Banking Operating Committee & Managing Director)
Chris Masto: Bain & Company; Morgan Stanley
Rajat Duggal: Bain Capital; Kirkland & Ellis; Deloitte & Touche
Nancy Graham Ford: Thomas H. Lee Partners; Goldman Sachs
Aaron S. Money: DB Capital; Chase Securities
Cas Schneller: GTCR; William Blair
John Tudor: Bain Capital; Monitor Company

Operating Partners
Robert A. Eckert
Bob Keegan:  Goodyear Tire (Chairman & CEO); Kodak (President, Consumer Imaging); Avery Dennison (Global Strategy Officer)
Jeff Lane: Boise Inc. (Senior Vice President & General Manager); McKinsey & Company (Managing Director)
Rick Lenny: The Hershey Company (Chairman, President & CEO); Nabisco Biscuit Company (President); Pillsbury North America (President)
John Roach: Builders FirstSource (Chairman, CEO and Founder); Fibreboard Corporation (Chairman, President & CEO); Johns Manville (CFO); Unidare US (Executive Chairman & CEO)
Jack Scott: Heidrick and Struggles (Managing Partner); Korn/Ferry (Partner)

See also    
 List of venture capital firms

References

Sallie’s Fourth Horseman: Friedman Fleischer & Who?.  Wall Street Journal, April 16, 2007
Family Struggle, A Company's Fate.  New York Times, December 2, 2001
Former Hershey CHief Joins Friedman Fleischer Lowe.  New York Times, May 16, 2011

External links
Friedman Fleischer & Lowe (official website)

Financial services companies established in 1997
Private equity firms of the United States
Companies based in San Francisco